Pseudophilosophy is a term applied to a philosophical idea or system which does not meet an expected set of philosophical standards. There is no universally accepted set of standards, but there are similarities and some common ground.

Definitions
According to Christopher Heumann, an 18th-century scholar, pseudo-philosophy has six characteristics, the 6th of which has been considered to diminish the credibility of the first 5:
 A preference for useless speculation
 It appeals merely to human authority
 It appeals to tradition instead of reason
 It syncretises philosophy with superstition
 It has a preference for obscure and enigmatic language and symbolism
 It is immoral

According to Michael Oakeshott, pseudo-philosophy "is theorizing that proceeds partly within and partly outside a given mode of inquiry."

Josef Pieper noted that there cannot be a closed system of philosophy, and that any philosophy that claims to have discovered a "cosmic formula" is a pseudo-philosophy. In this he follows Kant, who rejected the postulation of a "highest principle" from which to develop transcendental idealism, calling this pseudo-philosophy and mysticism.

Nicholas Rescher, in The Oxford Companion to Philosophy, described pseudo-philosophy as "deliberations that masquerade as philosophical but are inept, incompetent, deficient in intellectual seriousness, and reflective of an insufficient commitment to the pursuit of truth." Rescher adds that the term is particularly appropriate when applied to "those who use the resources of reason to substantiate the claim that rationality is unachievable in matters of inquiry."

History

The term "pseudo-philosophy" appears to have been coined by Jane Austen.

Ernest Newman, an English music critic and musicologist, who aimed at intellectual objectivity in his style of criticism, in contrast to the more subjective approach of other critics, published in 1897 Pseudo-Philosophy at the End of the Nineteenth Century, a critique of imprecise and subjective writing.

According to Josef Pieper, for Pythagoras, Plato and Aristotle philosophy is the human search "oriented toward wisdom such as God possesses". It suggests that philosophy includes, in its essence, an orientation toward theology. Pieper notes:

Usage
The term is almost always used pejoratively and is often contentious, due to differing criteria for demarcating pseudophilosophy (see also: Demarcation problem).

Romanticism

According to physicist and philosopher of science Mario Bunge,

For Kant, intellectual knowledge is discursive knowledge, not intuitive knowledge. According to Kant, intuition is limited to the realm of senses, while knowledge is "essentially realised in the acts of researching, relating, comparing, differentiating, inferring, proving". Kant criticised Romantic philosophy, which is based on feeling and intuition, and not on "philosophical work":

Kant called Romantic philosophy pseudo-philosophy, "in which one is entitled not to work, but only to heed and enjoy the oracle in oneself in order to take complete possession of that wisdom toward which philosophy aims".

Mysticism

Mysticism has a long history. In the Age of Enlightenment mysticism had fallen into disrepute. Kant called mysticism pseudophilosophy. In the 19th century, with the rise of Romanticism, interest in mysticism was renewed. Rationalists and Lutherans wrote histories of mysticism to reject its claims, but there was a widespread interest in spiritualism and related phenomena.

Interest in Eckhart's works was revived in the early nineteenth century, especially by German Romantics and Idealist philosophers. Since the 1960s debate has been going on in Germany whether Eckhart should be called a "mystic". The philosopher Karl Albert had already argued that Eckhart had to be placed in the tradition of philosophical mysticism of Parmenides, Plato, Plotinus, Porphyry, Proclus and other neo-Platonistic thinkers. Heribert Fischer argued in the 1960s that Eckhart was a mediaeval theologian.

German Idealism

Arthur Schopenhauer wrote the following about Georg Wilhelm Friedrich Hegel:

A hundred and fifty years after Schopenhauer's death, physicist and philosopher of science Mario Bunge recommended "avoiding the pseudo-subtleties of Hegelian dialectics", and wrote of "Hegel's disastrous legacy": "It is true that Marx and Engels criticized Hegel's idealism, but they did not repudiate his cult of nonsense and his rejection of all modern science from Newton on." Bunge noted,

Continental philosophy

Soccio notes that analytically inclined philosophers tend to dismiss Heidegger's philosophy as pseudophilosophy. According to Christensen, Heidegger himself called the philosophy of Husserl scheinphilosophy.

Scientism

Dietrich von Hildebrand used the term to critique the central place modern science is occupying in western society:

Objectivism

Journalist Jonathan Chait used the term to criticize the work of Ayn Rand in "Ayn Rand's Pseudo-Philosophy", an article in The New Republic, in which he wrote, "She was a true amateur who insisted on seeing herself as the greatest human being who ever lived because she was almost completely unfamiliar with the entire philosophical canon." Physicist and philosopher of science Mario Bunge classified Rand as a "mercenary", among those who "seek to defend or propagate a doctrine rather than an analyzing ideas or searching for new truths", while science writer and skeptic Michael Shermer claimed that "it becomes clear that Objectivism was (and is) a cult, as are many other, non-religious groups". The Stanford Encyclopedia of Philosophy said of Rand, "For all her popularity, however, only a few professional philosophers have taken her work seriously."

Other uses

The term has been used against many different targets, including:
 To criticise dogmatism in general, "which is dissolved when philosophy incorporates the scientific method"
 To criticise any philosophy in general which does not meet the criteria of analytical or positivistic philosophy
 To criticise specific philosophical schools, traditions and systems:
 Platonism as "dogmatic metaphysics"
 Scholasticism and Medieval philosophy
 Romantic philosophy, which is based on feeling and intuition, not on discursive thought, "giving up rationality"
 To criticise some forms of idealism:
 German idealism, especially Hegel
 Continental philosophy
 Positivistic philosophy
 To label entire specific political worldviews as illogical:
 Marxism
 Nazism
 Ayn Rand's Objectivism
 To criticise several (pseudo)sciences:
 Social Darwinism
 Psychoanalysis
 To criticise some theistic worldviews:
 Catholicism
 Mysticism
 Modern spirituality and esotericism

See also
 Externism
 Flipism
 Non-philosophy
 Obscurantism
 Pataphysics
 Sophism

Notes

References

Sources

External links
 Ernest Newman, Pseudo-philosophy at the end of the nineteenth century. Vol. 1. An irrationalist trio: Kidd – Drummond – Balfour

Criticism
Pejorative terms
Metaphilosophy
Pseudo-scholarship
Deception